Jeffrey Irvine Cummings (born 1962) is an American lawyer from Illinois who serves as a United States magistrate judge of the United States District Court for the Northern District of Illinois. He is a nominee to serve as a United States district judge of the same court.

Education 

Cummings received a Bachelor of Arts, with high honors, from Michigan State University in 1984 and a Juris Doctor from Northwestern Pritzker School of Law, cum laude, in 1987, being inducted into the Order of the Coif.

Career 

Cummings served as a law clerk for Judge Ann Claire Williams of the U.S. District Court for the Northern District of Illinois from 1987 to 1989. From 1989 to 2019, he was co-managing partner at Miner, Barnhill & Galland, P.C. Cummings served as counsel to Barack Obama from 1996 to his senate election in 2004. He was sworn in as a magistrate judge on January 29, 2019. He assumed office on February 1, 2019. Cummings is a former board member of Chicago Lawyers’ Committee for Civil Rights.

Notable cases 

 In 1995, Cummings alongside Barack Obama represented ACORN, a voter registration organization in suing the State of Illinois in seeking to have it comply with the National Voter Registration Act of 1993.

 In 2009, Cummings secured a $630,000 settlement to a class of black workers with Area Erectors, Inc., who alleged termination based on race.

Notable rulings 

 As a magistrate judge in 2020, Cummings ruled that Illinois Governor J. B. Pritzker would not be required to sit for a deposition as part of a discrimination case against his 2018 campaign.

 In 2021, Cummings ordered the pretrial release of Jim Bob Elliott, a member of the group the Proud Boys, who was arrested for his participation of the January 6 United States Capitol attack.

Nomination to district court 

In December 2021, Cummings was recommended to the president by Senators Dick Durbin and Tammy Duckworth.  On January 18, 2023, President Joe Biden announced his intent to nominate Cummings to serve as a United States district judge of the United States District Court for the Northern District of Illinois. On January 31, 2023, his nomination was sent to the Senate. President Biden nominated Cummings to a new seat. His nomination is pending before the Senate Judiciary Committee. On February 15, 2023, a hearing on his nomination was held before the Senate Judiciary Committee.

References

External links 

1962 births
Living people
20th-century American lawyers
21st-century American judges
21st-century American lawyers
African-American judges
African-American lawyers
Illinois lawyers
Michigan State University alumni
Northwestern University Pritzker School of Law alumni
People from Fort Wayne, Indiana
United States magistrate judges